Glengarry Glen Ross is a 1992 American drama film adapted by David Mamet from his 1984 Pulitzer Prize–winning play Glengarry Glen Ross, and directed by James Foley. The film depicts two days in the lives of four real estate salesmen, and their increasing desperation when the corporate office sends a motivational trainer to threaten them that all but the top two salesmen will be fired within two weeks.

The setting is never explicitly stated. The play is set in Mamet’s hometown Chicago, Illinois, but the film includes numerous references to New York City, including an establishing shot of a New York City Subway platform followed by a close-up shot of a New York Telephone-branded payphone, NYPD police cars and insignia, New York license plates, and mostly New York accents. Film critics and journalists have nonetheless placed the setting in Chicago, possibly based on their familiarity with the original play. In addition, several Chicago suburbs are mentioned at various times (Morton Grove, Batavia, Kenilworth). Exterior shots were filmed on location in Sheepshead Bay, Brooklyn.

Like the play, the film is notorious for its use of profanity, leading the cast to refer to the film jokingly as "Death of a Fuckin' Salesman". The title of the film comes from the names of two of the real estate developments being peddled by the salesmen characters: Glengarry Highlands and Glen Ross Farms.

The film was critically acclaimed and is widely considered one of the best films of the 1990s. The world premiere was held at the 49th Venice Film Festival, where Jack Lemmon was awarded the Volpi Cup for Best Actor. Al Pacino was nominated for an Academy Award and a Golden Globe Award for Best Supporting Actor. Yet, the film was a box office failure for grossing $10.7 million in North America against a $12.5 million budget. It has since become a cult classic.

Plot
The film depicts two days in the lives of four real estate salesmen who are supplied with leads — the names and phone numbers of prospects — and use deceitful and dubious sales tactics. Many of the leads rationed out by office manager John Williamson lack either the money or the desire to actually invest in land. The firm sends Blake, one of its top salesmen, to motivate the team. In a torrent of verbal abuse, he gives them all notice of termination and tells them that the top deal-closers of the month (with one week to go) will keep their jobs and gain access to promising leads for the Glengarry Highlands development.

Shelley "The Machine" Levene is a once-successful salesman in a long-running slump and with a daughter in the hospital. Desperate to keep his job, Levene tries to persuade Williamson to give him some of the Glengarry leads, but Williamson refuses. Levene tries first to charm Williamson, then to threaten him, and finally to bribe him. Williamson is willing to sell some of the prime leads, but demands cash in advance, which Levene does not have.

Meanwhile, Dave Moss and George Aaronow complain about the firm's management, and Moss proposes that they strike back by stealing all the Glengarry leads and selling them to a competing agency. Moss's plan requires Aaronow to break into the office, stage a burglary and steal all of the prime leads. Aaronow wants no part of the plan, but Moss tries to coerce him, saying that Aaronow is already an accessory before the fact simply because he knows about the proposed burglary.

While all of these events are happening, Richard Roma, the office's top closer, tries to manipulate a meek, middle-aged man named James Lingk into buying a property. Framing the deal as an opportunity rather than a purchase, Roma plays on Lingk's feelings of insecurity.

The next day, when the salesmen come into the office, they learn that there has been a burglary and the Glengarry leads have been stolen. Williamson assures Roma that his contract with Lingk was not stolen, and he and the police question each of the salesmen in private. After his interrogation, an infuriated Moss has one last shouting match with Roma and leaves in disgust. Lingk arrives to demand his down payment back under the three-day cooling-off period because his wife objected to the deal. Roma tries several tactics to stall and confuse Lingk but is interrupted by the police detective, who wants to question him. He lies to Lingk, telling him that the check has not yet been cashed and there is time to change his wife's mind. Williamson, who is unaware of the tactic, contradicts him, causing Lingk to rush out of the office upset. Roma vulgarly berates Williamson for interfering, then submits to questioning.

Levene, proud of a massive sale he made that morning, takes the opportunity to mock Williamson in private. In his zeal to humiliate Williamson, he mentions that Williamson lied about cashing the check. Williamson realizes that Levene must have broken into the office and seen the check on his desk, and threatens to inform the police if he does not return the leads. Cornered, Levene admits that he sold the leads to a competitor and split the money with Moss. Levene attempts to bribe Williamson with a share of his sales to keep quiet, but Williamson scoffs that Levene has no sales. His latest buyers are a notorious deadbeat couple who have no money and merely enjoy talking to salesmen. Levene, crushed by this revelation, asks Williamson why he seeks to ruin him. Williamson coldly responds, "Because I don't like you." Levene pleads for his ill daughter, but Williamson rebuffs him and leaves to inform the detective.

Roma emerges from questioning. Unaware of the exchange, he compliments Levene on his sale and suggests that they form their own partnership. As Levene gets up to meet with the detective, he looks back wistfully at Roma, who has already returned to his sales work.

Cast

Production 
David Mamet's play was first performed in 1983 at the National Theatre in London. It won the  Pulitzer Prize in 1984. That year, the play made its American debut in Chicago before moving to Broadway. Producer Jerry Tokofsky read the play on a trip to New York City in 1985 at the suggestion of director Irvin Kershner who wanted to make it into a film. Tokofsky saw the play on Broadway and contacted Mamet. Stanley R. Zupnik was a Washington, D.C. based producer of B movies who was looking for a more profitable project. Tokofsky had co-produced two previous Zupnik films. In 1986, Tokofsky told Zupnik about Mamet's play, and Zupnik saw it on Broadway but found the plot confusing.

Mamet wanted $500,000 for the film rights and another $500,000 to write the screenplay. Zupnik agreed to pay Mamet's $1 million asking price, figuring that they could cut a deal with a cable company to bankroll the production. Because of the uncompromising subject matter and abrasive language, no major studio wanted to finance it, even with film stars attached. Financing came from cable and video companies, a German television station, an Australian cinema chain, several banks, and New Line Cinema across four years.

Al Pacino originally wanted to do the play on Broadway, but at the time he was doing another Mamet production, American Buffalo, in London. He expressed interest in appearing in the film adaptation. In 1989, Tokofsky proposed a role to Jack Lemmon. During this time, Kershner dropped out to make another film RoboCop 2, as did Pacino with Sea of Love. Alec Baldwin, also attached, was earmarked to play the Roma role vacated by Pacino. He reportedly left the project over a contract disagreement, the real reason being Pacino was still being considered for Roma, and would be cast over Baldwin if he elected to accept the role. James Foley's agent sent Foley Mamet's screenplay in early 1991, but Foley was hesitant to direct because he "wanted great actors, people with movie charisma, to give it watchability, especially since the locations were so restricted". Foley took the screenplay to Pacino, with whom he had been trying to work on a film for years. Foley was hired to direct, only to leave the production as well.

By March 1991, Tokofsky contacted Baldwin and begged him to reconsider doing the film. Baldwin's character was specifically written for the actor and the film, and is not in the play. Tokofsky remembers, "Alec said: 'I've read 25 scripts and nothing is as good as this. OK. If you make it, I'll do it'." The two arranged an informal reading with Lemmon in Los Angeles. Subsequently, the three organized readings with several other actors. Lemmon remembered, "Some of the best damn actors you're ever going to see came in and read and I'm talking about names". Tokofsky's lawyer, Jake Bloom, called a meeting at the Creative Artists Agency, who represented many of the actors involved, and asked for their help. CAA showed little interest, but two of their clients – Ed Harris and Kevin Spacey – soon joined the cast.

Because of the film's modest budget, many of the actors took significant pay cuts. For example, Pacino cut his per-movie price from $6 million to $1.5 million, Lemmon was paid $1 million, and Baldwin received $250,000. Other actors, like Robert De Niro, Bruce Willis, Richard Gere, and Joe Mantegna, expressed interest in the film. Mantegna had been in the original Broadway cast and won a Tony Award in 1985 for his portrayal of Roma.

Once the cast was assembled, they spent three weeks in rehearsals. With a budget set at $12.5 million, filming began in August 1991 at the Kaufman Astoria Studios in Queens, New York, and on location in Sheepshead Bay, Brooklyn, over 39 days. Harris remembered: "There were five and six-page scenes we would shoot all at once. It was more like doing a play at times [when] you'd get the continuity going". Alan Arkin said of the script, "What made it [challenging] was the language and the rhythms, which are enormously difficult to absorb". During filming, cast members would arrive outside of their required days, just to watch the other actors' performances.

The director of photography, Juan Ruiz Anchía, relied on low lighting and shadows. A color scheme of blues, greens, and reds was used for the first part of the film, and the second half has a monochromatic blue-grey color scheme.

During production, Tokofsky and Zupnik had a falling out over money and credit for the film. Tokofsky sued to strip Zupnik of his producer's credit and share of the producer's fee. Zupnik claimed that he personally put up $2 million of the film's budget and countersued, claiming that Tokofsky was fired for embezzlement.

Reception

Box office
Glengarry Glen Ross had its world premiere at the Venice Film Festival, where Jack Lemmon won the Volpi Cup for Best Actor. In addition, it was originally slated to be shown at the Montreal World Film Festival, but it was necessary to show it out of competition because it was entered into competition at the Venice Film Festival at the same time. Instead, it was given its North American premiere at the Toronto International Film Festival. The film opened in wide release on October 2, 1992 in 416 theaters, grossing $2.1 million on its opening weekend. It made $10.7 million in North America, below its $12.5 million budget.

Critical response
The film has a rating of 95% on Rotten Tomatoes based on 56 reviews, with an average rating of 8.5/10. The consensus reads, "This adaptation of David Mamet's play is every bit as compelling and witty as its source material, thanks in large part to a clever script and a bevy of powerhouse actors." On Metacritic, the film has a score of 82 out of 100, based on 30 critics, indicating "universal acclaim".

Owen Gleiberman gave the film an "A" rating in his review for Entertainment Weekly, praising Lemmon's performance as "a revelation" and describing his character as "the weaselly soul of Glengarry Glen Ross–Willy Loman turned into a one-liner". In his review in the Chicago Sun-Times, Roger Ebert wrote, "Mamet's dialogue has a kind of logic, a cadence, that allows people to arrive in triumph at the ends of sentences we could not possibly have imagined. There is great energy in it. You can see the joy with which these actors get their teeth into these great lines, after living through movies in which flat dialogue serves only to advance the story". In The Chicago Reader, Jonathan Rosenbaum lauded Foley for his "excellent feeling for the driven and haunted jive rhythms of David Mamet, macho invective and all" and called the film "a superb 1992 delivery of [Mamet's] tour de force theater piece". The Chicago Tribunes Dave Kehr hedged his praise, writing that the film was "a well written, well staged and well acted piece, though there is something musty in its aesthetic - that of the huge, bellowing method performance, plastered over a flimsy, one-set world".

Newsweeks Jack Kroll observed, "Baldwin is sleekly sinister in the role of Blake, a troubleshooter called in to shake up the salesmen. He shakes them up, all right, but this character (not in the original play) also shakes up the movie's toned balance with his sheer noise and scatological fury". In his review for The New York Times, Vincent Canby praised the portrayal of "the utterly demonic skill with which these foulmouthed characters carve one another up in futile attempts to stave off disaster. It's also because of the breathtaking wizardry with which Mr. Mamet and Mr. Foley have made a vivid, living film that preserves the claustrophobic nature of the original stage work".

In his review for Time, Richard Corliss wrote, "A peerless ensemble of actors fills Glengarry Glen Ross with audible glares and shudders. The play was zippy black comedy about predators in twilight; the film is a photo-essay, shot in morgue closeup, about the difficulty most people have convincing themselves that what they do matters". However, Desson Howe's review in The Washington Post criticized Foley's direction, writing that it "doesn't add much more than the street between. If his intention is to create a sense of claustrophobia, he also creates the (presumably) unwanted effect of a soundstage. There is no evidence of life outside the immediate world of the movie".

Legacy
The film has had an enduring legacy for its memorable dialogue and performances, particularly by Alec Baldwin, whose character was created for the film adaptation to make the pressures of sales work more explicit. In 2012, on the 20th anniversary of its release, David Wagner of The Atlantic dubbed it a cult classic and Tim Grierson of Deadspin cited it as one of the "quintessential modern movies about masculinity". In 2014, English critic Philip French described the ensemble of Jack Lemmon, Al Pacino, Alan Arkin, Ed Harris, Kevin Spacey, and Alec Baldwin as "one of the best American casts ever assembled".

In 2005, Alec Baldwin performed in an SNL Christmas skit referencing the "Coffee Is For Closers" scene portraying a head elf sent by Santa.

Awards and nominations

 Empire magazine voted it the 470th greatest film in its "500 Greatest Movies of All Time" list.

References

External links

 
 
 
 
 
 
 
 

1992 films
1992 drama films
1992 independent films
1990s English-language films
American films based on plays
American business films
American drama films
American independent films
Films about businesspeople
Films based on works by David Mamet
Films directed by James Foley
Films scored by James Newton Howard
Films shot in New York City
Films set in offices
Films with screenplays by David Mamet
New Line Cinema films
1990s American films
Films about salespeople